Reid Venable Moran (June 30, 1916 – January 21, 2010) was an American botanist and the curator of botany at the San Diego Natural History Museum from 1957 to 1982.

Moran was the world authority on the Crassulaceae, a family of succulent plants, and in particular the genus Dudleya, the subject of his Ph.D. dissertation. He named at least 18 plants new to science — some in that family and some not — and published many papers elucidating relationships within the Crassulaceae. As a mark of the respect he earned among his peers, more than a dozen plants have been named for him. Jane Goodall described Moran as "a sort of living myth in botanical exploration in Baja California and the Pacific Islands of Mexico," citing specifically his analysis of the environmental impact of introduced species (especially goats) on the flora of Guadalupe Island.

Biography
Born in Los Angeles, California on June 30, 1916 to Edna Louise Venable and Robert Breck Moran (a petroleum geologist), Moran was raised in Pasadena. By 1932, 16-year old Moran was noted as a "discriminating young collector" of Dudleya. A now invalid species of Dudleya known as Dudleya moranii was named after him. He received his B. A. from Stanford University in 1939 and his M. S. from Cornell University in 1942. After service as a navigator in the Army Air Corps from 1942 to 1946, Moran received his Ph.D. in Botany from the University of California, Berkeley in 1951. His doctoral dissertation was titled "A Revision of Dudleya (Crassulaceae)."

Moran died on January 21, 2010, in Clearlake, California.

Career 
Moran conducted a botanical survey of the Channel Islands for the Los Angeles County Museum of Natural History and performed taxonomic work for the Santa Barbara Botanical Garden and the Bailey Hortorium at Cornell University before joining the San Diego Museum of Natural History as curator of botany, succeeding Ethel Bailey Higgins in 1957.

Moran specialized in the systematics of the Crassulaceae (the stonecrop family), and in the floristics of the Baja California peninsula. In addition to a large number of technical research papers, Moran published  The Flora of Guadalupe Island and the treatment of the Crassulaceae for the Flora of North America (Vol. 8, published in 2009). He co-authored (with Frank W. Gould) The Grasses of Baja California, Mexico in 1981 and (with Geoffrey A. Levin) The Vascular Flora of Isla Socorro, Mexico in 1989.

Among Moran's publications was "Cneoridium dumosum (Nuttall) Hooker F. Collected March 26, 1960, at an Elevation of about 1450 Meters on Cerro Quemazón, 15 Miles South of Bahía de Los Angeles, Baja California, México, Apparently for a Southeastward Range Extension of Some 140 Miles" (1966), a paper which comprised, apart from its title and acknowledgements, just five words and a reference number.

See the list of genera and species described by Moran.

See also 

 Joseph Nelson Rose and Nathaniel Lord Britton
 Paul Thomson
 Dudleya

References

External links

 Works by Reid Moran at JSTOR
 Works by Reid Moran at the Biodiversity Heritage Library
The San Diego Natural History Museum Research Library houses a significant collection of Reid Moran’s papers and photographs.
Finding aid to the Reid Moran Collection, Online Archive of California.
Moran's 18 volumes of field notes are digitized and indexed at BajaFlora.org: The Flora of Baja California
The University and Jepson Herbaria houses a collection of lists of label data for Reid Moran’s botanical collections made in the Philippines, Korea, Okinawa, Japan, and Guam between 1954 and 1956.
Photographs (prints, negatives, and slides) taken by Moran of the flora and physical features of the Baja California Peninsula and Guadalupe Island are held in the Robert B. and William R. Moran MSS Collection at the University of California, Santa Barbara.

American botanists
American curators
American taxonomists
1916 births
2010 deaths
Botanists active in California
People associated with the San Diego Natural History Museum
Botanists active in Asia
Botanists active in North America
Natural history of San Diego County, California
People from San Diego
Scientists from California
20th-century American scientists